WPC may refer to:

Events
 Microsoft Worldwide Partner Conference, an annual conference held by the Microsoft Corporation
 World Puzzle Championship, an annual international puzzle competition
 World Policy Conference, an annual conference on global governance

Governmental organizations
 Weather Prediction Center, part of the U.S. National Weather Service
 Western Power Corporation, owned by the Government of Western Australia, the major electricity supplier from 1995 through 2006
 Wireless Planning & Coordination Wing, an Indian government branch

Other organizations
 West Penn Conference, intercollegiate athletic conference that operated from 1958 to 1969 in Western Pennsylvania
 Westminster Presbyterian Church (disambiguation)
 Western Pennsylvania Conservancy, a charity based in Pittsburgh, Pennsylvania, United States
 Wildlife Preservation Canada, a wildlife conservation organization
 Wireless Power & Communication, a privately held company based in Norway
 Wireless Power Consortium, the business alliance that developed the Qi inductive power standard
 Women's Political Council, an Alabama-based organization that was part of the Civil Rights Movement
 Women's Press Collective, an all-woman publisher between 1969 and 1978 founded by Judy Grahn
 Workingmen's Party of California, an American labor organization
 World Parkinson Congress, a support organization people with Parkinson's Disease
 World Peace Council, an anti-war organization based in Athens, Greece
 World Plumbing Council, an international organization concerned with plumbing standards
 World Policy Council, a think tank based in Washington, D.C., United States
 World Powerlifting Congress, an international sports federation
 World Press Cartoon, a cartoonist organization

Other uses
 Whey concentrate, or whey protein concentrate
 Williams Pinball Controller, a set of circuit boards used in pinball machines throughout the 1990s
 Woman police constable, a former rank in the British police and other commonwealth countries, see History of the Metropolitan Police Service 
 Wood-plastic composite, composite materials made of wood fiber and thermoplastics
 WPC 56, a British television drama series
 A code given to numerous United States Coast Guard cutters
 Billy Corgan, an American musician and songwriter
 William Prideaux Courtney, biographer who contributed to the Dictionary of National Biography as "W. P. C."
 Wireless-powered communication

See also
 WPCS (disambiguation)